Custódio João Pinto (9 February 1942 – 21 February 2004) was a Portuguese footballer who played as a central midfielder.

Club career
Born in Montijo, Setúbal District, Pinto made his senior debut with FC Porto, first appearing in the Primeira Liga at the age of 19. During his ten-year spell with the northerners he amassed competitive totals of 311 matches and 102 goals, but only won one trophy, the 1968 Portuguese Cup.

In the summer of 1971, Pinto signed with Minho club Vitória de Guimarães, where he would play four seasons (always in the top flight). He retired from professional football at 36 after a stint with F.C. Paços de Ferreira, but returned to the Segunda Liga two years later when he signed with Oliveira do Bairro SC.

International career
Pinto earned 13 caps for Portugal, scoring once. He made his debut on 29 April 1964 by coming on as an 80th-minute substitute in a 3–2 friendly win over Switzerland in Zürich, and was selected to the squad that appeared in the 1966 FIFA World Cup, not leaving the bench for the third-placed team.

Pinto's last international match was played on 4 May 1969 in Porto, as Portugal drew 2–2 against Greece for the 1970 World Cup qualifiers, eventually finishing bottom in their group.

Personal life
Pinto died on 21 February 2004 shortly after having celebrated his 62nd birthday, in the northern city of Gondomar.

His older brother, Manuel, was also an international footballer.

Honours
Porto
Taça de Portugal: 1967–68; Runner-up 1963–64

Portugal
FIFA World Cup third place: 1966

References

External links

1942 births
2004 deaths
People from Montijo, Portugal
Sportspeople from Setúbal District
Portuguese footballers
Association football midfielders
Primeira Liga players
Liga Portugal 2 players
FC Porto players
Vitória S.C. players
F.C. Paços de Ferreira players
Portugal international footballers
1966 FIFA World Cup players